Kenza may refer to:

People
 Kenza al-Awrabiya, mother of Idris II of Morocco and spouse of Idris I.
 Kenza Morsli (born 1990), Algerian singer.
 Kenza Zouiten (born 1991), Swedish fashion model.
 Kenza, South African DJ and music producer.

Other uses
 Kenza (album), a 1999 studio album by Khaled.